Lethrinops lunaris is a species of cichlid endemic to Lake Malawi where it occurs in shallow waters with sandy substrates.  This species grows to a length of  TL.  It can also be found in the aquarium trade.

References

lunaris
Fish of Lake Malawi
Fish of Malawi
Fish described in 1931
Taxa named by Ethelwynn Trewavas
Taxonomy articles created by Polbot